The 1991 Northwestern Wildcats team represented Northwestern University during the 1991 NCAA Division I-A football season. In their sixth year under head coach Francis Peay, the Wildcats compiled a 3–8 record (2–6 against Big Ten Conference opponents) and finished in ninth place in the Big Ten Conference.

The team's offensive leaders were quarterback Len Williams with 1,630 passing yards, Dennis Lundy with 568 rushing yards, and Mark Benson with 831 receiving yards.

For the game against Ohio State, Northwestern played a home game against Ohio State in Cleveland.

Schedule

Roster

References

Northwestern
Northwestern Wildcats football seasons
Northwestern Wildcats football